A briefcase is a narrow hard-sided box-shaped bag or case used mainly for carrying papers and equipped with a handle. Lawyers commonly use briefcases to carry briefs to present to a court, hence the name. Businesspeople and other white collar professionals also use briefcases to carry papers, and since the 1980s, electronic devices such as laptop computers and tablet computers. Some briefcases have only a main internal space, while others may have subsections, accordion sections, small pockets, or dividers. Briefcases may be made from leather, vinyl, durable fabric, thin metal (such as aluminium), or plastic. Leather, vinyl, or fabric briefcases may have externally-accessible pockets or sleeves in addition to the main storage space. Some briefcases made of fabric may have a shoulder strap. Briefcases typically have a lock to protect the contents. Nowadays, briefcases may have padded internal pouches to protect laptop computers.

History 
Briefcases are descendants of the limp satchel used in the fourteenth century for carrying money and valuables. It was called a "budget", derived from the Latin word "bulga" or Irish word "bolg", both meaning leather bag (in Irish it also means 'stomach'), and also the source of the financial term "budget".

Godillot of Paris was the first to use a hinged iron frame on a carpet bag in 1826. There then followed the Gladstone bag and the Rosebery, an oval-top bag. Eventually these became the modern metal-framed briefcase. The first of what is known as the modern rectangular briefcase is said to have been invented in the late 1850s. In 2014 the global business bag market was $9.4 billion.

Types 

 A portfolio is a handleless case for carrying in the hand or under the arm.
 A folio case is a portfolio with a retractable handle.
 An attaché case (or sometimes called diplomat case) is a box-style case characteristically made of leather fitted over an internal hinged frame that opens into two compartments. It was traditionally carried by an attaché, a diplomatic officer attached to an embassy or consulate officially assigned to serve in a particular capacity (e.g., cultural attaché; military attaché). Frameless aluminum is also used.  In recent years, leather pouches (usually slightly larger than a sheet of A4 paper) with a zipper sealed compartment have been referred to as attachés or poche document holders.
 A catalog case or catalogue case is a large (deep) attaché case.

See also 

 Backpack
 Messenger bag
 Nuclear briefcase
 Red box (government)
 Suitcase
 Tablet case

References

External links 

 

Bags
Luggage